Terell Mondasia Thomas (born 18 October 1995) is a professional footballer who plays as a defender for Charlton Athletic. Born in England, he represents the Saint Lucia national team.

Thomas started at Arsenal before signing his first professional contract in June 2015 with Charlton Athletic. He went on to enjoy two loan spells at National League side Woking. He was released in June 2017, and joined fellow League One side Wigan Athletic. Thomas was then subsequently sent out on loan to Sutton United until the end of the 2017–18 campaign. Thomas signed permanently for AFC Wimbledon in the summer of 2018, prior to the Dons' third consecutive League One campaign.

Club career

Charlton Athletic
After joining Charlton Athletic as a teenager from Arsenal, Thomas become a key figure in Charlton's academy side. After appearing as an unused substitute several times throughout the 2014–15 campaign, he signed a new two-year contract running until June 2017.

Woking (loan spells)
On 31 August 2015, Thomas joined National League side Woking on a one-month youth loan deal, making his professional debut the same day in Woking's 2–0 home victory against Welling United, playing the full 90 minutes. After impressing at Woking, Thomas' loan spell was extended until 2 January 2016. However, with Woking, struggling through October and November, Thomas was dropped and played just one further game before returning to Charlton in January.

On 20 October 2016, Thomas returned to Woking on a one-month loan to help the Cards in their relegation battle. Two days later, Thomas made his return in Woking's 1–1 home draw with high-flying Barrow, playing for 70 minutes before being replaced by Fabio Saraiva. On 21 January 2017, after stabilising the Woking defence, his loan spell was extended until the end of the 2016–17 season. On 14 February, Thomas scored his first professional goal in Woking's 2–1 home victory over Solihull Moors, heading in from a corner to give the Cards a 1–0 lead. On 25 February 2017, Thomas scored his second goal of the season in a 4–3 away defeat against Forest Green Rovers, netting a consolation in the 94th minute. Following a successful relegation fight, Thomas returned to Charlton after featuring 33 times and scoring three goals for the Cards.

Wigan Athletic
Following his release from Charlton, Thomas joined fellow League One side Wigan Athletic on a one-year deal on 16 June 2017. On 5 August 2017, Thomas made his Football League debut during Wigan's 1–0 away victory against Milton Keynes Dons, replacing Nick Powell at half-time. Three days later, he made his first start for Wigan in an EFL Cup tie against Blackpool, featuring for 65 minutes in the 2–1 home victory.

Sutton United (loan spell)
On 29 December 2017, Thomas returned to the National League, joining Sutton United on a 28-day loan deal. A day later, he made his Sutton debut in their 1–0 away defeat against league leaders Macclesfield Town, playing the full 90 minutes. On 31 January 2018, Thomas' loan with Sutton was extended until the end of the season. On 24 February 2018, Thomas scored his first goal for the club during their 4–0 victory over Guiseley, stabbing home an effort after a mistake from goalkeeper, Luke Coddington.

Following an impressive loan spell at Sutton, Wigan triggered a one-year option in Thomas's current deal, extending his contract until June 2019.

AFC Wimbledon
On 16 July 2018, despite signing a new one-year deal with Wigan, Thomas made the switch to League One side AFC Wimbledon for an undisclosed fee. On 4 September 2018 Thomas made his Dons debut in a 2–2 draw against Charlton Athletic in the EFL Trophy at The Valley. On 3 November 2018 Thomas made his league debut for the Dons in a 2–1 loss to Shrewsbury Town at Kingsmeadow. He scored his first goal for Wimbledon in a 1–0 win over Portsmouth on 19 October 2019.

During July 2021, it was confirmed by manager, Mark Robinson that Thomas would leave the club at the end of his contract, following interest from Championship and fellow League One clubs.

Crewe Alexandra
On 12 August 2021, Thomas signed a 12-month contract at League One side Crewe Alexandra, replacing Crewe signing Tommie Hoban after he had announced his surprise retirement from professional football. Thomas made his Crewe debut on 17 August 2021 in a 1–0 defeat at Oxford United, conceding the penalty that gave the home side victory. On 31 January 2022, after Thomas had made 19 appearances, it was announced that his contract had been terminated by mutual consent.

Reading
On 24 March 2022, Thomas joined Reading on a deal until the end of the season after impressing on trial. On 20 May 2022, Reading confirmed that Thomas would leave the club upon the expiration of his contract.

Return to Charlton Athletic
On 7 September 2022, Thomas returned to Charlton Athletic on a one-year deal.

International career
In June 2022, Thomas was called up to the Saint Lucia squad for the CONCACAF Nations League games against Dominica and Anguilla.

Career statistics

International

References

External links

1997 births
Living people
Footballers from Rainham, London
Association football defenders
Arsenal F.C. players
Charlton Athletic F.C. players
Woking F.C. players
Wigan Athletic F.C. players
Sutton United F.C. players
AFC Wimbledon players
Crewe Alexandra F.C. players
Reading F.C. players
National League (English football) players
English Football League players
English footballers
Saint Lucian footballers
Saint Lucia international footballers
Saint Lucian expatriate footballers